Harrison Bryant (born April 23, 1998) is an American football tight end for the Cleveland Browns of the National Football League (NFL). He played college football at Florida Atlantic, where he was a unanimous All-American and won the John Mackey Award. Bryant was drafted by the Browns in the fourth round of the 2020 NFL Draft.

Early life and high school
Bryant grew up in Gray, Georgia and attended John Milledge Academy, where he played baseball, basketball, and was a two-way starter for the football team. He originally played offensive tackle before moving to tight end going into his senior year. As a senior, Harrison had 39 receptions for 608 yards and scored 10 touchdowns on offense and 100 tackles with 11 sacks on defense.

College career
As a true freshman, Bryant caught six passes for 63 yards. The following season, he became the Owls starting tight end and finished the year with 32 receptions for 408 yards and five touchdowns and was named second-team All-Conference USA. As a junior, Bryant caught 45 passes for 662 yards and four touchdowns and was named first-team All-Conference.

As a senior, Bryant led all Division I tight ends with 65 receptions and 1,004 receiving yards and had seven touchdown catches. He was again named first-team All-Conference USA and received the John Mackey Award as the nation's best tight end. Bryant was the first player from a Group of Five conference to win the award. He was named a consensus first-team All-American, becoming the first FAU player to do so. Bryant finished his collegiate career with 148 receptions for 2,137 yards and 16 touchdowns.

Professional career

Bryant was drafted by the Cleveland Browns in the fourth round with the 115th overall pick of the 2020 NFL Draft. He signed his rookie contract with the Browns on May 20, 2020. Bryant made his professional debut on September 13, 2020, in the season opener against the Baltimore Ravens, catching one pass for five yards. He scored his first career touchdown, a three-yard reception on a pass from Baker Mayfield, on September 27, 2020, in a 34–20 win over the Washington Football Team in Week 3. In Week 7 against the Cincinnati Bengals, he had four receptions for 56 receiving yards and two touchdowns in the 37–34 victory. He became the Browns' first rookie tight end with a multiple-touchdown performance since Harry Holt in 1983. He was placed on the reserve/COVID-19 list by the team on December 29, 2020, and activated on January 9, 2021. Bryant finished his rookie season with 24 receptions for 238 yards and three touchdowns in 15 games played and was named to the PFWA All-Rookie Team.

NFL career statistics

Regular season

References

External links
Florida Atlantic Owls bio
Cleveland Browns bio

Living people
Players of American football from Georgia (U.S. state)
Florida Atlantic Owls football players
American football tight ends
People from Gray, Georgia
1998 births
All-American college football players
Cleveland Browns players